The ThinkStation is a line of professional workstations from Lenovo. They are designed to be used for high-end computing and CAD tasks and primarily compete with other enterprise workstation lines, such as Dell's Precision, HP's Z line, and Apple's Mac Pro line.

2022

P360 
Lenovo launched ThinkStation P360 Tower Workstation model.  The new model is powered by Intel® 12th Gen  Core™ processors with NVIDIA® professional graphics support & VR-ready option. The model claims to be eco-certified and built with sustainable materials. The prices for the model starts at $1,049.00.

2021

P350 
P350 is the successor of model P340, with the -generation of Intel CPUs and PCI Express 4.0.

2020

P340 
P340 is the successor of model P330, with the -generation of Intel CPUs.

2019 

Lenovo on May 7, 2019 introduced upgraded versions of its ThinkStation P720 and ThinkStation P920 workstations. The new workstations are based on up to two Intel Xeon scalable Cascade Lake  processors featuring up to 28 cores per socket and running at up to 4.4 GHz. The CPUs are paired with up to 384 GB or 2 TB of DDR4-2933 memory on P720 or P920 respectively, as well as multiple NVIDIA Quadro RTX 8000 or Quadro GV100 graphics cards. Both machines support several NVMe/PCIe SSDs (either in M.2 form-factor or on a special PCIe 3.0 x16 Quad M.2 adapter) as well as up to 60 TB of HDD capacity.

2018

P330 
Lenovo described the P330, available in three form factors, as "entry-level workstations."  As the middle digit of the model number implied, these replacements for the 320 series represented a new generation of architecture and design language. The P330 series was available with -generation (Coffee Lake) processors, including Xeon E Workstation CPUs.

2017

P520/P520c 
Lenovo announced both of the P520 models in November 2017. The main notable difference beside versions are the number of RAM slots (8 slots with maximum of a 256 GB RAM in the P520 vs. 4 slots/128 GB in the P520c).

P720/P920 
A mid/high-end dual-socket solution. Official specs:
 Processors: 2x
 RAM: 384 GB / 1 (or 2) TB (LRDIMM/RDIMM) ECC, DDR4-2666 (12 / 16 slots)
 PSU: 850 W / 1400 W proprietary

2016

P310 
The ThinkStation P310 is an "entry-level" workstation and replacement for the P300 ThinkStation. It comes standard with an Intel Xeon E3-1200v5 processor and an Nvidia GPU. It can accommodate up to 64 GB of RAM, and supports Lenovo's FLEX drive system.

P510 
A high-end single-socket solution. Official specs:
 Processor: Up to Intel Xeon E5-2600 v4 (22*2.2 GHz)
 RAM: Up to 256 GB RDIMM 2400 MHz (8 slots)
 Graphics: 2x PCI-e x16 slots, up to NVIDIA Quadro P6000 or Tesla K40 in base
 PSU: 490 or 650 W, proprietary

P710 
A regular dual-socket solution. Official specs:
 Processors: 2x  Intel's E5-2600 v4 Broadwell processor family 
 Memory: DDR4 memory modules (RDIMM) at 2400 MHz. Fully loaded with 32 GB RDIMM modules in all 12 slots (6 DIMMs per processor), 8-channel capable (4-channel per processor), and outfitted with dual processors the system sill support up to 384 GB of memory.
 Storage: Up to 12 storage devices, and a maximum storage capacity of 36 TB. A Flex Connector just above the internal storage bays can support a maximum of two optional dual M.2 storage devices using a Flex Adapter. The system features an integrated storage controller operating a 6 Gbit/s but for more RAID options and faster speed, users can install an optional LSI 9364-8iPCIe adapter with 1 GB memory and 12 Gbit/s SAS SATA support.
 Expansion: Support for up to three GPU graphics (three PCIe 3.0 x16 slots, two via CPU1, one via CPU2.) or computational accelerators from Nvidia.
 Power supply: One fixed 650 watts or 850 watts, autosensing, 92%, 80 PLUS Platinum qualified. 650 W: 1x150 W + 2x75 W with onboard SATA controller and up to two 120 W CPU each; 850 W: 1x300 W + 2x75 W (up to two 120 W CPU each), or 2x150W+1x75W.

P910 
A high-end dual-socket solution. Official specs:
 Processors: 2x
 RAM: 896 GB/512 GB (LRDIMM/RDIMM) ECC, DDR4-2400 (16 slots)
 Graphics:
 PSU: 1300 W proprietary

2015

P700 
The P700 was introduced in November 2015.  It has simple black case with red accents that includes numerous places on its front for headphones, a card reader, USB ports, etc. The side panel includes a keyed lock and can be removed by depressing a steel lever. All internal components are modular and designed to be removed and replaced without tools. The P700 uses Intel Xeon processors. Nvidia graphics cards come standard.

Specifications:
 Processor: Up to 2 x 18-Core E5-2699 v3 2.3/3.6 GHz 45 MB 
 RAM: Up to 768 GB LRDIMM (384 GB RDIMM) 2133 MHz – 2 x Quad Channel (12 x (64 GB LRDIMM or 32 GB RDIMM))
 Power: 650 W or 850 W

2014

P Series 

Lenovo launched the P Series at SIGGRAPH 2014 in Vancouver, Canada. The P Series is designed for use in engineering, architecture, professional video, energy production, finance, and other computationally intensive industries. The series includes the P900, P700, P500, and P300 models. The P Series uses Xeon processors from Intel and Quadro video cards from NVIDIA in base. The P300 line uses Haswell-based Xeons and supports dual channel memory. The P500 uses single Haswell-E Xeons and quad channel memory. The P700 uses dual Haswell-E Xeons. The P900 is similar to the P700 but uses multi-PCIe and has enhanced IO. The P Series is ISV-certified for all applications.

The P Series is based on Lenovo's "Flex" system of trays and connectors that are designed to enable toolless upgrades. The Flex Bay at the front of each unit can be configured with an optical drive or a variety of options such card readers and FireWire connections. Drives are installed using Flex Bays that come in 2.5" and 3.5" sizes. Each tray can handle one 3.5" drive or two 2.5" drives. The Flex Connector is a mezzanine card that links the motherboard via PCIe to SATA, SAS, and RAID devices without using up card slots.

P500 
A high-end single-socket solution. Official specs:
 Processor: Intel Xeon E5-2699 v3 (18*2.67 GHz)
 RAM: Up to 512/256 GB LRDIMM/RDIMM 2133 MHz (8 slots)
 Graphics: 2x PCI-e x16 slots, up to NVIDIA Quadro M6000 or Tesla K20
 PSU: 490 or 650 watt, proprietary

2013

S30 
The Lenovo ThinkStation S30 was introduced in 2013. It features Intel Sandy Bridge chipsets and processors and was later upgraded to Intel's Ivy Bridge Core i5\i7 and Intel Xeon processors from four cores (e.g. Intel Xeon E5-1620 v2) up to twelve cores, such as the high-end model Intel Xeon E5-2697 v2.

E32 
On August 21, 2013, Lenovo introduced the ThinkStation E32 professional workstation that is available in either a tower or 12.9L small form factor chassis. The E32 incorporates the latest Intel Haswell chipset and supports the Intel Xeon E3 and 4th generation processors as well as the Intel Core i7 and Core i5 series processors. The E32 supports both on-board Intel HD Graphics P4600 as well as NVIDIA NVS or Quadro 3D graphics cards, up to the K4000. The E32 supports up to 32 GB of 1600 MHz, DDR3 ECC memory in both form factors and has USB 3.0 ports on the front and rear of the chassis for a total of six USB 3.0 ports.

As are all Lenovo ThinkStations, the E32 is fully ISV certified for applications suites from Autodesk, Adobe, Dassault Systèmes, PTC and Siemens, as well as many others. The E32 makes an ideal entry-level platform for CAD and AEC users. Both the tower and SFF configurations are reliable and "green," offering 80 Plus Platinum certification with up to 92% power efficiency. Due to the integration of the Intel Haswell microarchitecture and Microsoft officially ending support for the Windows XP operating system in April 2014, the E32 is the first ThinkStation model that does not support the installation of Windows XP.

2012

D30 
The ThinkStation D30 is a full-sized traditional tower workstation released in 2012. As is typical for ThinkStations, the front panel features a perforated honeycomb shaped pattern. The D30 can hold up to two Intel Xeon eight-core processors that feature hyperthreading in order to support the processing of up to 32 simultaneous streams of data. Video is powered by Nvidia Quadro graphics cards. The D30 scored a very high 25.31 points on the Cinebench test of 3D rendering. For comparison, the late 2012 Apple Mac Pro only scored 7.36 points on the same test.

In a review of the D30 PC Magazine wrote, "Sometimes, you just need to bring out the big stick, and the Lenovo ThinkStation D30 is that big stick. The sheer power of the dual eight-core Xeon CPUs plus the ability to add on more powerful Nvidia Quadro cards means that this is a system to scorch project deadlines in minutes rather than hours, or hours instead of days. Our last dual-processor workstation Editors' Choice was the Lenovo ThinkStation C20, which amazed us by putting dual Xeon CPUs in a more compact chassis. The Lenovo ThinkStation D30 now usurps that mantle, as the dual-processor workstation Editors' Choice. It wins with power, expandability, and a ruthless devotion to get your project done before any of your rivals can."

C30 
The ThinkStation C30 is a high-end dual-processor workstation designed for use in video editing, engineering, and finance. The C30 is slightly smaller than a full-sized tower but still comes with two PCI slots, two free PCIe x16 card slots for graphics cards, a free PCIe x4 slot, and space for two free hard drive bays. Two Intel Xeon E5-2620 processors, 16 GB of ECC DDR3 system memory, an Nvidia Quadro 4000 graphics card, and a 500 GB hard drive come standard. There is an option to rack mount the C30.

PC Magazine wrote, "The Lenovo ThinkStation C30 is a very good dual-processor workstation. It is a powerhouse for the space constrained financial, DCC, or engineering user in your organization. The system therefore comes highly recommended, but its roomier, more powerful, and more expensive big brother the Lenovo ThinkStation D30 holds on to the Editors' Choice for dual-processor workstations for the time being for having a lot more power and being more flexible for future upgrades."

2011

E30 
Announced in March 2011, the E30 workstation could be equipped with either Intel Core i or Intel Xeon processors. The workstation could be equipped with either 80GB or 160GB solid state drives. Discrete graphics were available on the workstation, in the form of NVIDIA Quadro or NVS graphics.

When the E30 was launched, Tao Gu, the executive director and general manager of Lenovo's Workstation Business Unit said, "We created the ThinkStation E30 workstation to offer extremely powerful processing on a software-certified solution at desktop prices."

Detailed specifications of the workstation are as follows:
 Processor: up to 3.5 GHz Intel Xeon E3-1280
 RAM: Up to 16 GB DDR3 1333 MHz ECC (4 slots)
 Integrated Graphics:
 Intel HD 3000 or HD P3000
 2D Graphics: up to NVIDIA Quadro NVS 450 (512 MB)
 3D Graphics: up to NVIDIA Quadro 2000 (1 GB)
 Storage:
 Up to 2 TB 7200 RPM SATA
 Up to 600 GB 10,000 RPM SATA
 Up to 160 GB SSD
 Dimensions (mm): 412 x 175 x 420
 Weight:

2010

C20 
The C20 workstation was compact, designed to be easy to mount on a rack. This compact size allowed up to 14 workstations to be stacked in a standard 42U rack. It also meant that users who used a single workstation were offered extra space either on or beneath their desk.

Detailed specifications of the workstation are as follows:
 Processor: 2x 2.67 GHz Intel Xeon E5650
 RAM: Up to 48 GB 1066 MHz (6 slots)
 Graphics: NVIDIA Quadro FX 4800 (dual)
 Storage: 500 GB
 Operating System: Windows 7 Professional (64 bit)
 Optical Drive: One 5.25" bay, with DVD- or Blu-ray reader/writer

SLASHGEAR stated that they "had trouble slowing the C20 down – this isn’t a PC where opening a few dozen browser windows will cause lag – and it stayed admirably quiet too (though fan noise did ramp up as the system was stressed during benchmark testing)". The reviewer also stated that the price would be far too high for most people to afford.

The reviewer summed up the workstation by saying, "Graphics professionals, video editors or anyone looking to do vast amounts of crunching in minimal amounts of time, however – and without turning their office into a server farm – should definitely be considering the C20."

In addition, since the machine was designed as a workstation used by graphic professionals and video editors it was not intended to replace high end gaming machines.

PCMag received the workstation positively, awarding it 4 out of 5 stars as well as an Editors' Choice award.

The workstation has been certified by several ISVs, including:
 Autodesk: 3ds Max (2008/2009), Alias Studio 2008, AutoCad 2008, Maya (2008 Extension 2/2009/2010), Softimage 2010
 Dassault Systèmes: Catia (V5R18/V5R19/V6R2009x), SolidWorks
 PTC: CoCreate Modeling, Pro/E Wildfire 4.0, Pro/E Wildfire 5.0
 Siemens: NX 4, NX 5

E20 
The E20 workstation was called ‘a "real" workstation for the price of a consumer PC’ by PCMag. It received the "Honorable Mention" award in PCMag's "Best of the Year" 2010 awards. The workstation also included several environmentally friendly features. Among these were Energy Star 5.0 and GREENGUARD certifications. The workstation incorporated 66% recycled plastics, with several recycling programs available from Lenovo once the workstation reached end-of-life.

Desktop Review received the workstation positively saying, "Quiet, capable and offering excellent build quality, the ThinkStation E20 is a good option for those in need of a workstation's benefits in a slimmer, more efficient package." The workstation was awarded 4 out of 5 stars by Desktop Review.

Detailed specifications of the workstation are as follows:
Processor: 3.2 GHz Intel Core i5-650
RAM: base 4 GB (4 slots)
Storage: 500 GB
Graphics: NVIDIA Quadro FX 580
Optical Drive: Dual-Layer DVD+/-RW
Operating System: Microsoft Windows 7 Professional

The workstation has received certifications from several ISVs, including:
Autodesk: AutoCad (2009-2011)
Dassault Systèmes: Catia V5, SolidWorks (2009-2011)

2009

S20 
The S20 workstation was released by Lenovo in 2009 and had significant expansion options. The workstation included a PCI, PCIe x1, and two PCIe x16 slots. The workstation also included space for a second optical drive, and two additional 3.5 inch hard disk drive bays. There were also 10 USB ports and 1 eSATA port. However, there was no standard Firewire port. The S20 workstation also included several environmentally friendly certifications including EPEAT Gold, RoHS, Energy Star 5.0 and GREENGUARD.

Detailed specifications of the workstation are given below:
Processor: 2.93 GHz Intel Xeon W3540
RAM: 4 GB DDR3 ECC 1333, up to 24 GB (6 slots)
Storage: 500 GB
Graphics: NVIDIA Quadro FX 4800
Optical Drive: Dual-Layer DVD reader/writer
Operating System: Microsoft Windows Vista Business

The S20, like other workstations in the ThinkStation product line, has been certified by multiple ISVs, including:
Autodesk: 3ds Max (2008/2009), AutoCAD 2008, Inventor (2008/2009), Maya (2008 Extension 2/2009/2010), Softimage 2010
Dassault Systèmes: Catia (V5R18/V5R19/V6R2009x), SolidWorks (2007/2008/2009/2010)
Siemens: NX 4, NX 5

D20 
Also released in 2010 along with the S20, the D20 workstation was reported by Desktop Engineering as bearing a strong resemblance to the S20, although it was noticeably larger. According to Desktop Engineering, the D20 workstation delivered very high scores on their benchmark tests, both for Windows XP and Windows Vista. Despite the presence of several fans, the workstation was reported to be nearly silent after the initial boot.

Detailed specifications for the workstation are as follows:
Processors: Up to 2x 2.67 GHz Intel Xeon X5550
RAM: 8 GB DDR3 SDRAM (1333 MHz) up to 96 GB (UDIMM) or 192 GB (RDIMM) (12 slots)
Graphics: NVIDIA Quadro FX 4800
Storage: two 500 GB 7200 RPM SATA (in RAID 0 array)
Optical Drive: 16x dual-layer DVD reader/writer

2008

S10 

In its review of the S10, Trusted Reviews indicated that the workstation used a consumer chipset – while also saying, "Looking at the available specifications, there's nothing to raise suspicion that these machines may underperform."

Detailed specifications of the workstation are as follows:
Processor: Up to Intel Core 2 Quad QX6850
RAM: Up to 8 GB DDR3-1066 ECC (4 slots)
Graphics: 2x PCI-e x16, 1x PCI-e x4.
NVIDIA Quadro NVS 290 (256 MB VRAM)
NVIDIA Quadro FX 370 (256 MB VRAM)
NVIDIA Quadro FX 1700 (512 MB VRAM)
NVIDIA Quadro FX4600 (768 MB VRAM)
Storage:
Up to 750 GB 7200 RPM SATA
Up to 300 GB 15,000 RPM SAS
Optical Drive: Two 5.25" bays, DVD or Blu-ray Burner
Form Factor: mid-tower
Dimensions (mm): 426 x 175 x 483
Power supply: 650 Watt, ATX

D10 
For the D10 workstation, Lenovo incorporated server grade chipset and processors, as opposed to the S10. The Intel 5400a chipset used in the workstation supported two Intel Xeon processors and 64 GB RAM. The size of the workstation's motherboard necessitated a larger case to accommodate it. However, the increase in size offered additional drive bays. The case could also be mounted on a rack.
The detailed specifications of the D10 workstation are as follows:
Processors: Up to 2x Intel Xeon E5365
Chipset: Intel 5400a
RAM: up to 64 GB DDR2-667 ECC FB-DIMM 240-pin Fully Buffered (8 slots)
Graphics: 2x PCI-e x16
NVIDIA Quadro NVS 290 (256 MB VRAM)
NVIDIA Quadro FX 370 (256 MB VRAM)
NVIDIA Quadro FX 1700 (512 MB VRAM)
NVIDIA Quadro FX4600 (768 MB VRAM)
Storage:
Up to 750 GB 7200 RPM SATA
Up to 300 GB 15,000 RPM SAS
Optical Drive: Three 5.25" bays, DVD or Blu-ray Burner
Form Factor: Tower
Dimensions (mm): 434 x 210 x 602
Power supply: 1000 Watt Proprietary

See also 
 Dell Precision
 Mac Pro
 Fujitsu Celsius
 HP Z

References 

Computer workstations
Computer-related introductions in 2008
Lenovo computers